Baron Pál Esterházy de Galántha (1 February 1587 – 17 January 1645) was a Hungarian noble, son of Vice-ispán (Viscount; vicecomes) of Pozsony County Ferenc Esterházy. He was the founder of the Zólyom branch of the House of Esterházy. His brother was, among others, Nikolaus, Count Esterházy who served as Palatine of Hungary.

Life

He converted to Roman Catholicism from Lutheranism in his youth. He served as chamberlain of Gabriel Bethlen, Prince of Transylvania. Later he joined to the side of Matthias II of Hungary. He was appointed Knight of the Golden Spur after the coronation of Ferdinand II.

Pál fought in the Thirty Years' War, against the Bohemian uprising. As a result, he was created Baron in 1619. He seriously injured in Moravia. In 1626, he defended the fortress of Nógrád and also participated in other battles against the Ottoman Empire. He acquired the lordships of Zólyom (today: Zvolen, Slovakia) and Dobrovina from his brother Miklós, the Palatine. Baron Pál founded the Zólyom branch of his family.

Family
Baron Pál Esterházy married to Zsuzsanna Károlyi de Nagykároly at first in 1614. They had three children:

 Ferenc (1615 – 26 August 1652), killed in the Battle of Vezekény
 Erzsébet (1616–1668), married to Baron István Hédervári de Hédervár in 1634
 Zsuzsa, died young (c. 1634)

His first wife, Zsuzsanna died in 1621. Baron Pál married for the second time to Éva Viczay de Loós, younger sister of Baron Ádám Viczay de Loós. The marriage produced the following children:

 Emenne (1626–1631), died young
 Rebeka (1631 – after 16 June 1647)
 Zsófia (1633 – 20 March 1688), married to Baron György Berényi de Karancsberény (1601–1677) in 1650
 Miklós (1634 – 19 August 1688), Ispán (Count; comes) of Zólyom County, castellan of Buják
 Magdolna (1635–1708)
 Sándor (1636 – 2 April 1681), heir of the Zólyom lordships
 Ilona (1638 – 26 September 1651), died young
 Gábor (d. before 1653)
 Péter (d. before 1653)
 Dániel (d. before 1653)

References

1587 births
1645 deaths
Pal
Barons of Hungary
Hungarian soldiers
Converts to Roman Catholicism from Lutheranism
People from Galanta
17th-century philanthropists